James John O'Hara (born James John Ehrich; December 3, 1925 – January 17, 2002) was a commissioner and then executive secretary for the Minnesota Board of Boxing from 1976 to 2001. When O'Hara was appointed to the Minnesota Board of Boxing, he was a retired light heavyweight amateur and retired professional heavyweight boxer. O'Hara retired from the ring in 1953 with a claim to the Minnesota professional heavyweight title after a win over Don Jasper.

Boxing career

Golden Gloves
O'Hara competed in the Northwest Golden Gloves tournament in 1943, 1944, and 1945 as a light heavyweight. He was 4-F, unfit for military service, due to gout attacks which he suffered all his life.

Over the winter of 1943–1944, O'Hara won the St. Paul Golden Gloves tournament as a light-heavy. He finished runner up at the Northwest Golden Gloves tournament, having been rated an even chance to win the championship.

During the 1945 Golden Gloves, a rivalry began between O'Hara and Earl Adkinson that followed the fighters into their professional careers. O'Hara and Adkinson fought three times in 1945, with O'Hara never managing the upper hand over Adkinson.

Minnesota State Heavyweight Champion 
O'Hara's unanimous decision over Don Jasper on August 27, 1953, gave him a claim to the Minnesota professional heavyweight title, though there was some controversy, as the fight was only six rounds as opposed to ten.

Amateur fight record

Professional fight record

Minnesota Boxing Commissioner 
O'Hara was appointed to the Minnesota Board of Boxing in 1976 by Minnesota Governor Wendell Anderson. Soon after, O'Hara was voted by the board to serve as its executive secretary, a paid advisory position, in which capacity he served for 25 years.

"He was a great mediator and diplomat," said Joe Azzone, past Chair of the Boxing Board. "I always thought Jim was the wisest guy I ever met," said international boxing referee Denny Nelson. "He knew how to handle people."

O'Hara was one of four long-term leaders in the history of boxing regulation in Minnesota. The others were George Barton (who served 27 years), Jack Gibbons (19 years), and Scott LeDoux (23 years, including 18 years with O'Hara). A journalist for over 50 years, Barton received in 1952 the James J. Walker Award from the Boxing Writers' Association of New York. Jack Gibbons, the son of boxing legend Mike Gibbons, boxed professionally as a light-heavy and retired with a record of 57 wins (20 by KO), five losses (none by KO), and one draw. Scott LeDoux was a former heavyweight contender in the 1970s and 1980s.

Personal life and death

Mike O'Hara 
On November 3, 1951, Jimmy O'Hara's brother and fellow boxer, Michael Ehrich (known as Mike O'Hara), was shot and killed by Bernard L. "Mutt" Martineau. Martineau was convicted of manslaughter and sentenced to ten to twenty years in Stillwater prison. After his retirement from the ring, Jimmy helped create a boxing program at Stillwater prison.

John O'Hara 
Another brother, John O'Hara, was a professional middleweight boxer with a record of 18 wins, 13 losses, and one draw. John O'Hara reportedly drew with Ronald Reagan in a street fight.

Business 
O'Hara made his living as a businessman, partnering with Jerry Hurley as a wholesaler to bars and restaurants.

Cancer 
O'Hara died on January 17, 2002, from late-stage bladder cancer.

Legacy

Boxing 
O'Hara was inducted into the Minnesota Boxing Hall of Fame in 2014, ultimately being recognized for his work in boxing administration, including 25 years as head of the Minnesota Boxing Board. His commemoration reads, in part:"He was an iconic figure on the streets of St. Paul [Minnesota], a man recognized by countless of his fellow citizens. He was very simply Mr. Boxing."

Upon O'Hara's death in 2002, St. Paul Pioneer Press sportswriter Tom Powers offered this assessment: "O'Hara, as much a part of the fabric of St. Paul as the cathedral or the capitol building, worked with promoters, handlers and fighters, always gently steering them in the right direction. He could tell them where to get proper health insurance as easily as he could recommend a qualified referee.

References 

1925 births
2002 deaths
Boxers from Saint Paul, Minnesota
Boxing people
Deaths from bladder cancer